Mohsen (MO) Shahinpoor (born 1943) is an Iranian American engineer, scientist, and academician. He is a professor and Director at the University of Maine College of Engineering, Department of Mechanical Engineering. He is also a professor in the Graduate School of Biomedical Science and Engineering at the University of Maine.

Shahinpoor has conducted research in biomimetic, flexible, soft robotics, robotic surgery, smart materials, electroactive polymers, ionic polymer-metal composite (IPMCs) soft actuators, self-powered energy harvesters, and sensors. He has authored over 600 publications, and 93 books and volume publications. His books include, Intelligent Robotic Systems: Modeling & Simulation, Intelligent Materials, Artificial Muscles: Applications of Advanced Polymeric Nano Composites, and High-Pressure Shock Compression of Solids. His book entitled Fundamentals of Smart Materials is the first textbook on Fundamental of Smart Materials with a solutions manual. He is a co-editor of a Smart Materials Series published by the Royal Society of Chemistry.

Shahinpoor is a Fellow of the American Society of Mechanical Engineers (ASME), Institute of Physics (IOP), National Academy of Inventors, the Royal Society of Chemistry (RSC), and the International Association for Advanced Materials (FIAAMs).

Shahinpoor is also a chess player. He is a Topic Editor-in-Chief of Bioinspired Robotics, Int. Journal of Advanced Robotic Systems, and a Founding Editor and Editor-in-Chief of International Journal of Environmentally Intelligent Design and Manufacturing. His work has been featured multiple times in media articles.

Education
Shahinpoor completed his initial education from Iran and received his B.Sc. degree in Chemical, Materials and Petroleum Engineering from Abadan Institute of Technology's College of Engineering in 1966. He then moved to USA and received his M.Sc. and Ph.D. degrees in Mechanical and Aerospace Engineering from the University of Delaware in 1968 and 1970, respectively. From 1971 till 1972, he was a postdoctoral research fellow at Johns Hopkins University.

Career
Following his doctoral studies, Shahinpoor went back to Iran and was employed by Shiraz University as an Assistant Professor of Mechanical Engineering. He was promoted to Associate Professor in 1972 and to Professor of Mechanical Engineering in 1976. He then moved back to the US and taught as a Professor of Mechanical and Industrial Engineering at Clarkson University from 1979 till 1984.

Shahinpoor joined the University of New Mexico in 1984 as a Professor of Mechanical Engineering. During his tenure at the university, he was appointed as Regents Professor of Mechanical Engineering from 1984 till 2002, and was twice appointed as Halliburton Endowed Chair Professor of CAD/CAM, CIM & Robotics. Shahinpoor also held secondary appointments at University of New Mexico's School of Medicine as a Professor of Surgery and Biomedical Engineering from 1996 till 2002, and as a Research Professor of Surgery from 2002 till 2007.

In 2007, Shahinpoor joined University of Maine as a Professor of Biomedical Science and Engineering and held appointment as Richard C. Hill Professor till 2014. He was then appointed as Professor of Mechanical Engineering at University of Maine.

Shahinpoor chaired the Department of Mechanical Engineering at Shiraz University in the early 1970s, and co-directed the Robotics & Manufacturing Center at Clarkson University in the 1980s. At University of Mexico, Shahinpoor served as Chair of the Mechanical Engineering Department for seven years, along with directing the Intelligent Materials, Structures and Systems Laboratory, CAD/CAM, CIM & Robotics Laboratories, Spine Biomechatronics Laboratory, and the Artificial Muscle Research Institute. He has also served as an Associate Dean of Engineering from 1993 till 1995 at the University of New Mexico. In 2002, he was appointed as a Chief Scientist and Director of Biomedical Products at Environmental Robots Incorporated. He is serving as the Director of the Advanced Robotics Laboratory, the Director of the Smart Materials, Artificial Muscles and Tissue Manufacturing Laboratory, and the Director of the Biomedical Engineering and Robotic Surgery Laboratory at the University of Maine, since 2007.

Research
Shahinpoor has worked on Ionic Polymer Metal Composites (IPMCs), Biomimetic Soft Artificial Muscles, Biomimetics and Artificial Muscles, Mechatronics, Electroactive Polymers, and Ionic Polymer Metal Composites (IPMCs), Nano-Bio Engineering, Intelligent Robotic Systems, Robotic Surgery, Health Engineering, Heart Assist Systems, Bionic Vision and Ophthalmological Engineering as well as Neuro and Endovascular Surgical Tools and Medical Implants.

On the materials side, he and his students have invented the ionic polymeric, artificial muscles (IPMCs) as actuator, energy harvester and sensor, and robotic artificial muscles, wrote the first book on artificial muscles, and made smart materials contributions. His publication Biomimetic Robotic Venus Flytrap has received recognition by numerous journals and media channels. He also wrote the first textbook on Robotics by a Mechanical Engineering professor and has contributed to soft biomimetic robots.

Ionic polymer-metal composites as biomimetic sensors, actuators and artificial muscles
Shahinpoor has conducted extensive research on ionic polymeric-metal composites (IPMCs) and in a paper published in 1995, he explained the micro-electro-mechanics of ionic polymeric gels as electrically controllable artificial muscles. He introduced the mathematical modeling relating to IPMCs and identified the key parameters based on the vibrational and resonance characteristics of sensors and actuators made with IPMCs. He presented the successful working of artificial muscles in harsh cryogenic environments. Shahinpoor, along with Kwang J. Kim, published a paper in 2000s and presented a fabrication method for adjusting the scale of IPMC artificial muscles in a strip size of micro-to-centimeter thickness.

In the 2000s, Shahinpoor authored review papers on IPMCs and discussed the manufacturing techniques, phenomenological laws and mechanical characteristics of the composites along with the methodologies in developing high-force-density IPMCs. He also presented various modeling and simulation techniques, along with industrial and biomedical applications of IPMCs.

Advanced Nanocomposites and Electroactive Polymers
Shahinpoor worked with NASA in a study to reduce the mass, size, the instrumentation cost and the power consumed in its future missions. He studied two groups of electroactive polymer (EAP) materials such as bending ionomers and longitudinal electrostatically driven elastomers, which can be used as an alternative to current actuators. He conducted an analysis of the electrical characteristics of the ionomer EAP, discussed its major limitations, and developed an EAP driven miniature robotic arm which was controlled by a MATLAB code for the lifting and dropping of the arm, and for the opening and closing of EAP fingers of a 4-finger gripper.

Shahinpoor authored a paper in the late 1990s on the development of effective EAP driven mechanisms, which emulate human hand such as a gripper, manipulator arm and a surface wiper; and also highlighted the need for greater actuation force capability.

Neuro and Endovascular Surgical Tools and Medical Implants
Shahinpoor's research has also focused on neurological and endovascular surgical tools and medical implants. He has registered in his name several patents relating to surgical tools and medical implants which include spinal implants, implantable pump apparatuses and self-powered micro-pump assembly. He developed zonular mini-bridge implants made of polymeric gels, silicone polymers or a composite, for the surgical correction of presbyopia and hyperopia.

Awards and honors
1977 - Engineering Researcher of the Year l977 Award, selected jointly by the Academy of Sciences of Iran and Ministry of Science and Higher Education of Iran, awarded by Her Majesty the Queen Farah of Iran 
1983 - Awarded "Eminent Engineer" title, U.S. National Engineering Honor Society 
1986 - Award of Achievement for the creation of the world's first multi-station Robotics Instructional Laboratory at UNM, U.S. Society of Technical Communications 
1986 - Faculty Achievement Award for Excellence in Teaching and Research, University of New Mexico's Burlington Northern Foundation 
1988 - Halliburton Endowed Chair Professorship in CAD/CAM, CIM & Robotics, School of Engineering, University of New Mexico 
1989 - Elected Fellow of ASME, American Society of Mechanical Engineers
1991 - Award for Excellence in Manufacturing Engineering Education, Society of Manufacturing Engineers 
1992 - Awarded the title of "Engineer of the Year 1992”, US Society of Professional Engineers 
1993, 1994 - Award for Excellence in Research, Sandia National Laboratories
1996 - Faculty Achievement Award, University of New Mexico Libraries
2001 - Elected Fellow, Institute of Physics, UK
2003 - Space Act Award for “Development of A Space Dust Wiper Made With Polymeric Artificial Muscles”, NASA 
2008 - Distinguished Member of the Francis Crowe Society with Medallion, University of Maine
2015 - Elected Fellow, Royal Society of Chemistry
2015 - Elected Fellow, US National Academy of Inventors
2020 - Elected Fellow, International Association for Advanced Materials

Bibliography

Selected books
High-Pressure Shock Compression of Solids (1993) ISBN 978-0387979649
Intelligent Robotic Systems: Modeling & Simulation (1994) ISBN 978-1884077005
Energy, Matter, Intelligence and Life (EMIL); The Evolution of EMIL (2000) ISBN 978-1884077067
Artificial Muscles: Applications of Advanced Polymeric Nano Composites (2007) ISBN 978-1584887133
Robotic Surgery: Smart Materials, Robotic Structures and Artificial Muscles (2014) ISBN 978-9814316231
Ionic Polymer Metal Composites (IPMCs): Smart Multi-Functional Materials and Artificial Muscles, Volume 2 (2015) ISBN 978-1782627210 
Fundamentals of Smart Materials (2020) ISBN 978-1782626459

Selected articles
Shahinpoor, M., & Kim, K. J. (2001). Ionic polymer-metal composites: I. Fundamentals. Smart materials and structures, 10(4), 819.
Shahinpoor, M., Bar-Cohen, Y., Simpson, J. O., & Smith, J. (1998). Ionic polymer-metal composites (IPMCs) as biomimetic sensors, actuators and artificial muscles-a review. Smart materials and structures, 7(6), R15.
Shahinpoor, M., & Kim, K. J. (2004). Ionic polymer–metal composites: IV. Industrial and medical applications. Smart materials and structures, 14(1), 197.
Kim, K. J., & Shahinpoor, M. (2003). Ionic polymer–metal composites: II. Manufacturing techniques. Smart materials and structures, 12(1), 65.
Shahinpoor, M., & Kim, K. J. (2004). Ionic polymer–metal composites: III. Modeling and simulation as biomimetic sensors, actuators, transducers, and artificial muscles. Smart materials and structures, 13(6), 1362.

References 

Living people
1943 births
American engineers
University of Maine faculty
University of Delaware alumni